John Sebastian Little (March 15, 1851 – October 29, 1916) was an American politician who served as a member of the United States House of Representatives and the 21st Governor of the U.S. state of Arkansas.

Biography
John Sebastian "Bass" Little was born in Jenny Lind in Sebastian County, Arkansas, the son of Jesse Eaton Little and Mary Elizabeth (Tatum) Little, and grandson of Eaton Tatum and Charlotte Bruer (Reynolds) Tatum. Little attended Cane Hill College in Washington County for one term.

Little taught school and studied law. He was admitted to the Arkansas bar in 1873, and in 1876 he was elected prosecuting attorney of the 12th Judicial District. He served in that position until 1882.

Little married Elizabeth Jane Irwin on January 4, 1877, in Paris, Arkansas.

Career
Little served in the Arkansas House of Representatives in 1884, and in 1886 was appointed judge in the Twelfth Judicial Circuit and served for four years.

In 1894 he was elected to fill the unexpired term of U.S. Representative Clifton R. Breckinridge. He served in the United States House of Representatives until 1907 when he resigned his seat to take office as Governor of Arkansas.

Little was inaugurated in January 1907, and shortly thereafter suffered a nervous breakdown which left him unable to execute his political duties. He was succeeded by the president of the Arkansas state senate, John Isaac Moore.

Death
Little left Arkansas and went to the Texas gulf coast in an effort to rehabilitate. Little never recovered and died in Little Rock, in the Arkansas State Hospital for Nervous Disorders. He is buried at the City Cemetery in Greenwood.

References

External links

 Encyclopedia of Arkansas History & Culture entry: John Sebastian Little

Democratic Party governors of Arkansas
Democratic Party members of the Arkansas House of Representatives
1851 births
1916 deaths
People from Sebastian County, Arkansas
Democratic Party members of the United States House of Representatives from Arkansas
19th-century American politicians